Ragamala or Raga mala ("garland of raga") can refer to:
 Ragmala, composition of twelve verses in the Guru Granth Sahib
 Ragamala Dance Company, Minneapolis-based dance company that showcases the ancient Bharatanatyam dance form
 Ragamala paintings, series of illustrative paintings of ragas (modes in Indian music)
 Raga Mala (book), autobiography by Ravi Shankar, published in 1997
 Ragamalika, a Carnatic music form with different verses set in different ragas
 Raga Mala, sitar concerto by Ravi Shankar, first performed in 1981 and conducted by Zubin Mehta